Zafar Ali Khan (1874– 27 November 1956) ( – ), also known as Maulana Zafar Ali Khan, was a Pakistani writer, poet, translator and a journalist who played an important role in the Pakistan Movement against the British Raj. He is generally considered to be "the father of Urdu journalism."

Early life
Zafar was born into a Punjabi Janjua family in Sialkot, British India. He received his early education at Mission High School, Wazirabad, Gujranwala District., matriculated (10th grade) from Patiala, and passed his intermediate (12th grade) from the Aligarh College. Next, he worked in the postal department of the state of Jammu and Kashmir, the same place where his father worked, but resigned over a row with his seniors. He rejoined Aligarh College and gained his BA degree from there.

Career 
After graduation, Khan was appointed secretary to a Muslim political leader Mohsin-ul-Mulk, then in Bombay. Then he worked for some time as a translator in Hyderabad, Deccan, rising to the post of Secretary, Home Department. He returned from Hyderabad and launched his daily Zamindar newspaper from Lahore which was founded by his father Maulvi Sirajuddin Ahmad.

Relation with the Ahmadiyya Movement

Zafar Ali Khan's relationship with the Ahmadiyya movement was complex. His father had been an ardent admirer of Mirza Ghulam Ahmad and other leading Ahmadis such as Maulana Hakeem Noor-ud-Din. His maternal uncle Maulana Hassan Khan and his cousins were also prominent Lahori Ahmadis. He worked on multiple collaborative projects with Ahmadis such as Khwaja Kamaluddin and even praised the movement. However, in the 1930s he published Anti Ahmadi vitriol in the Zamindar, and even wrote some anti Ahmadi poetry. Close to the time of death there was still some social interaction and amicability as the second Ahmadi Khalifa, Mirza Bashir ud din Mahmood, personally paid for his medical care until his passing in 1956.

Poetry 
He chose to write in Urdu, instead of his mother tongue Punjabi. Khan's interest in poetry began in his childhood. His poems have religious and political sentiment. He was specially versed in impromptu compositions. His poetical output includes Baharistan, Nigaristan, and Chamanistan. His other works are Marka-e-Mazhab-o-Science, Ghalba-e-Rum, Sayr-e-Zulmet and an opera Jang-e-Roos-o-Japan.

Most popular Naats
 'Woh shama ujala jis ne kiya 40 baras tak ghaaron mein' sung by Mehdi Hassan, a Radio Pakistan production, a popular Naat written by Zafar Ali Khan
 '' sung by Muneeba Sheikh, a Pakistan Television production, a popular Naat written by Zafar Ali Khan

Death
He died on 27 November 1956, Wazirabad, Punjab. His funeral prayer was led by his companion Mohammad Abdul Ghafoor Hazarvi.

Memorials and legacy
Sahiwal Stadium, а multi-purpose stadium in Sahiwal, Punjab, was renamed as Zafar Ali Stadium in his honour. It is used for football and cricket games. The stadium holds 10,000 people.

He served the Pakistan Movement and is acknowledged as the father of Urdu language journalism. It has been said of him:
"he was the father of Urdu journalism, … the Zamindar newspaper, when Zafar Ali Khan was the proprietor and editor, was the Urdu newspaper for the Muslims." Recognising Zafar Ali Khan's contributions to the Pakistan Movement, the Punjab government in Pakistan established a 'Maulana Zafar Ali Khan Trust' that initiated the 'Zafar Ali Khan Award' for outstanding journalists to be awarded every year. A public degree college in Wazirabad is named after him as Government Molana Zafar Ali Khan Degree College.

Pakistan Post issued a commemorative postage stamp in his honor in its 'Pioneers of Freedom' series.

Books
Some of his notable publications include:

Poetry
Bahāristān
Nigāristān
Camanistān
Rahāristān
Armag̲h̲ān-i Qādiyān
Kulliyāt-i Maulānā Ẓafar ʻAlī K̲h̲ān
Ḥabsiyāt
Nashīd-i Shīrāz, collection of Persian poems and articles published in different periodicals 
K̲h̲amistān-i Ḥijāz, poetry about Muhammad

Essays
G̲h̲albah-yi Rūm : ek tārīk̲h̲ī tafsīr, historical commentary of Sūrat ar-Rūm on the victory of Romans over the Persians and the Muslims over the Meccan polytheists as predicted by Koran in AD 615
Taqārīr-i Maulānā Ẓafar ʻAlī K̲h̲ān̲, speeches of the author, especially in regard with the Khilafat movement
Lat̤āʼifuladab, on the relation between literature and Islam
Mʻaās̲h̲irat, on the social sciences
Jamāluddīn Afg̲h̲ānī : yaʻnī itiḥād-i Islāmī ke muharrik-i aʻzīm, Misr, Ṭarkī, Īrān aur Hindūstān ke z̲arīʻah ʻalim-i Islām man̲, biography of the Muslim reformer and independence fighter Jamāl al-Dīn al-Afghānī

Plays
Jang-i Rus va Japān : yaʻnī ek tārīk̲h̲ī ḍrāmā, a play on the Russian Japanese War, 1904–1905

Translations
Jangal buk, Urdu translation from the English of Rudyard Kipling's Jungle Book
Al-Farooq : the life of Omar the Great, English translation from the Urdu of Shibli Nomani's Al-Farooq, a biography of Umar

See also 

List of Pakistani journalists
List of people on the postage stamps of Pakistan

Notes 

Maulana would never miss a chance to snub the British government and the Heavens had provided him ample opportunities to carry out his sacred mission. Shaheed Ghazi Ilam Din had killed a blasphemous person and was sent to gallows in the Mianwali jail. The government buried him in Mianwali which infuriated the Muslims in Punjab. They protested and made a unanimous demand to bring Shaeed's body to Lahore but no one was prepared to give coverage to their voice as Hindus dominated most of the newspapers in the old Punjab before 1947. A large procession led by Lal Din Qaiser reached the office of Zamindar in 1903 newspaper which was the only hope for the Muslims at that time and succeeded in getting newspaper coverage for their event.

References

Aligarh Muslim University alumni
Leaders of the Pakistan Movement
Pakistani male journalists
Pakistani writers
1874 births
1956 deaths
Punjabi people
Members of the Central Legislative Assembly of India
Pakistani media personalities
Indian people of World War II
People from Wazirabad